Gorsky is a rural locality (a khutor) in Dobrinskoye Rural Settlement, Uryupinsky District, Volgograd Oblast, Russia. The population was 515 as of 2010.

Geography 
Gorsky is located in forest steppe, 9 km northwest of Uryupinsk (the district's administrative centre) by road. Gorsko-Popovsky is the nearest rural locality.

References 

Rural localities in Uryupinsky District